Lee Tsz-ting (born 25 April 1996) is a Hong Kong rugby union player. She was selected for Hong Kong's 2017 Women's Rugby World Cup squad. She made her ninth cap appearance against New Zealand at Fly-half.

Lee studied at Hong Kong Polytechnic University. The 2016 Hong Kong Women's Sevens was her first Hong Kong event.

References 

1996 births
Living people
Hong Kong people
Hong Kong rugby union players
Hong Kong female rugby union players
Hong Kong female rugby sevens players